Böritigin or Böri (in Turkic the name means wolf prince), also known as Pirai, was a Turkic officer, who served as the Samanid governor of Ghazna from 974/975 to 977.

During his rule, the people of Ghazni revolted against Samanids, and invited Abu Ali Lawik of the formerly ruling Lawik dynasty to come back to Ghazni, take the throne, and overthrow Böritigin. The Hindu Shahis supported the Lawiks and the king, most likely Jayapala, sent his son to assist Lawiks in the invasion. When the allied forces reached Charkh on the Logar River, they were attacked by Sabuktigin who killed and captured many of them while also capturing ten elephants. Böritigin was expelled and Sabuktigin was appointed as governor by the Samanid ruler Nuh II in 977.

References

Sources
 
 
 
 

Ghilman
10th-century Turkic people
Samanid governors of Ghazna
Turkic rulers
Slaves of the Samanid Empire